Nairobi is the business and financial centre of Kenya. This is highlighted by the number of companies and organizations headquartered in the city.

Companies headquartered in Nairobi
The following is a list of prominent companies and organizations with their main headquarters in Nairobi:
 East African Breweries
 Equity Group Holdings Limited
 Gulf African Bank
 KCB Group Limited
 Kenya Airports Authority
 Cambrian Valuers Limited
 Kenya Airways
 Kemnet Technologies
 Kangai Technologies
 Kenya Commercial Bank Group
 Kenya Electricity Generating Company (KenGen)
 Medici Group Africa
 Glowbal Digital
 Mumias Sugar Company
 Nation Media Group
 National Oil Corporation of Kenya
 National Social Security Fund
 NIC Bank Group
 Prudential Africa Services Limited
 Pertom Digital
 Sameer Group
 Serena Hotels
 Standard Group
 The Standard
 Kenya Television Network
 Unga Group
 United Nations
 United Nations Environment Programme
 United Nations Human Settlements Programme
 Safaricom
 Hostraha Limited
 WPP-Scangroup
Huki Group
Eminence Global Communications
Denote Data
Zandaux

International companies with African headquarters in Nairobi
The following is a list of multinational companies and organizations, with their African (continent-wide or regional) headquarters in Nairobi:

See also

 Economy of Kenya
 List of companies of Kenya

References

+